The Snoldelev Stone, listed as DR 248 in the Rundata catalog, is a 9th-century runestone that was originally located at Snoldelev, Ramsø, Denmark.

Description
The Snoldelev Stone, which is 1.25 meters in height, is decorated with painted scratches depicting a design of three drinking horns interlocking as incomplete Borromean rings (similar to the Diane de Poitiers three crescents emblem). The stone was first noted in 1810, and was turned over to the national Antiquities Commission in 1811. The runestone is now housed at the National Museum of Denmark in Copenhagen, Denmark.

The inscription on the Snoldelev Stone shows an early version of the Younger Futhark. Like the late Elder Futhark Björketorp Runestone, it uses an a-rune  which has the same form as the h-rune has in the long-branch version of the younger futhark. This a-rune is transliterated with capital A below. The Snoldelev runestone also retains the elder futhark haglaz rune for the h-phoneme and this is represented by capital H in the transliteration below. Another feature from the elder futhark is the use of the ansuz rune (ᚨ) which is here specifically used to symbolize a long nasal a, often transcribed as "á" which is similar but not identical to its Scandinavian descendant "å". The text is arranged in two lines of different size. It has been suggested that this may have been done in imitation of Merovingian or Carolingian manuscripts, which have the first line in long slender characters with the following lines in shorter, stubbier text.

The inscription states that Gunnvaldr is a Þulʀ, which signifies some office or rank, perhaps a priest or a skald, compare Old Norse þula meaning "litany." It is related to the later Norse Þulr, a position described as being a wise man or sage associated with Scandinavian chieftains and royalty. The translation offered by the Rundata project suggests reciter. The location Salhaugar in the text has been identified as referring to the modern town Salløv, which was in the vicinity of the original site of the runestone. The literal translation of the Old Norse Salhøgum combines sal "hall" with hörgar "mounds," to form "on the hall mounds," suggesting a place with a room where official meetings took place.

Inscription

Runes

Transliteration of the runes into Latin characters
kun'uAlts| |stAin ' sunaʀ ' ruHalts ' þulaʀ ' o salHauku(m)

Transcription into Runic Danish
Gunwalds sten, sonaʀ Roalds, þulaʀ á Salhøgum.

Translation in English
Gunnvaldr's stone, Hróaldr's son, thyle of Salhaugar.

Gallery

See also
Swastika (Germanic Iron Age)

References

External links
Inscriptions from the second period (Viking period), 750-1025, presentation by Moltke

Runestones in Denmark
Swastika
9th-century artifacts